is a former international table tennis player from Japan.

Table tennis career
Narita won a gold medal at the 1959 World Table Tennis Championships in the Swaythling Cup (men's team event) for Japan with Nobuya Hoshino, Teruo Murakami and Ichiro Ogimura.

He won an individual bronze medal during the 1958 Asian Games and at one stage held the number one ranking in Japan.

See also
 List of table tennis players
 List of World Table Tennis Championships medalists

References

Japanese male table tennis players
Asian Games silver medalists for Japan
Asian Games bronze medalists for Japan
Asian Games medalists in table tennis
Table tennis players at the 1958 Asian Games
Medalists at the 1958 Asian Games
World Table Tennis Championships medalists